Two streams named Little River flow to the North River, a tributary of the South Fork Shenandoah River in the U.S. state of Virginia. Both rivers flow within the George Washington National Forest.

See also
List of rivers of Virginia

References

USGS Hydrologic Unit Map - State of Virginia (1974)

Rivers of Virginia
Tributaries of the Shenandoah River